Doli Saja Ke was a Hindi language Indian soap opera that aired on Sahara One channel worldwide. The series premiered on 7 May 2007 and ended on 13 November 2009.

Cast

Main
 Barkha Sengupta as Anupama Kapoor / Anupama Chaitanya Shekhawat / Anupama Daksh Singhania / Tiya Kapoor  (Double Role)  
 Indraneil Sengupta as Daksh Singhania

Recurring
 Ravi Dubey as Veer Kapoor
Aruna Irani as Singhania (Dadi Maa) - Daksh's Grandmother
 Roma Bali as Meera Dhananjay Singhania 
 Nimai Bali as Dhananjay Singhania 
 Yash Sinha as Ishaan Khanna / Ishaan Singhania 
 Karishma Randhawa as Riddhima Kapoor / Riddhima Ishaan Khanna / Riddhima Ishaan Singhania
 Sangeeta Ghosh as Aditi Chaitanya Shekhawat / Neha 
 Ali Hassan as Mohit Verma / Advocate Aditya Gujral
 Anuj Saxena as Vikram Kapoor
 Akshay Anand as Vikram Kapoor
 Surbhi Tiwari as Kiran Vikram Kapoor
 Jividha Sharma as Diya
 Jaya Mathur as Maya Vikram Kapoor
 Sulakshana Khatri as Kanta 
 Adita Wahi as Namrata Veer Kapoor 
 Aruna Irani as Narayani Devraj
 Master Mohd Sami Shaikh as Anubhav Singhania
 Amit Sarin  as Chaitanya Shekhawat 
 Prabhat Bhattacharya as Indrajeet Shekhawat
 Mahru Sheikh as Sharda Shekhawat
 Mrinal Deshraj as Padmini Indrajeet Shekhawat
 Amar Upadhyay as Samar 
 Eijaz Khan as Veer Kapoor
 Shakti Anand as Arjun
 Ansha Sayed as Namrata Veer Kapoor 
 Sonia Singh as Juhi (Ved's wife)
 Manoj Bidwai as Ved
 Shriya Bisht as Rupali Agnihotri / Rupali Daksh Singhania
 Manish Khanna as Viren
 Manisha Kanojia as Veena
 Vishal Watwani as Rahul Saniyal 
 Kiran Kumar as Ravi Shekhawat 
 Amrapali Gupta as Riya 
 Rajesh Jais as Riya's Father
 Siddharth Dhawan as Anand
 Ram Mohan as Badri Kaka
 Nidhi Uttam as Sukanya Singhania
 Ashwin Kaushal as Advocate Shyam Munshi 
 Varun Khandelwal as Padmini's Elder Brother 
 Kanika Maheshwari as Sukanya Singhania
 Apara Mehta as Rukhsar
 Indira Krishnan as Geeta

External links 
 Official Website

2007 Indian television series debuts
Indian television soap operas
Sahara One original programming
2009 Indian television series endings